Otele is a town in central Cameroon.

Transport 
It is served by the main line of Cameroon Railways.  It is the junction for a short branch line to the river port of Mbalmayo.

Climate 
Köppen-Geiger climate classification system classifies its climate as tropical wet and dry (Aw).

See also 
 List of municipalities of Cameroon
 Transport in Cameroon
 Railway stations in Cameroon

References 

Populated places in Cameroon